John Leslie Watson (1909-1991), was an England international lawn bowler.

Bowls career
He won a gold medal in the Men's Rinks (Fours) at the 1962 British Empire and Commonwealth Games in Perth, with Sidney Drysdale, David Bryant and Tom Fleming.

He won the 1956 pairs National Championship with his brother Harry Watson representing Darlington East Park and Durham.

Personal life
He was an engineer by trade.

References

1909 births
1991 deaths
Commonwealth Games gold medallists for England
Commonwealth Games medallists in lawn bowls
Bowls players at the 1962 British Empire and Commonwealth Games
English male bowls players
Medallists at the 1962 British Empire and Commonwealth Games